Dhiraj Kumar Nath (January 9, 1945 – January 5, 2018) was a Bangladeshi diplomat.  He was named as an advisor of the interim caretaker government of Bangladesh in October 2006.

Education and career
Nath was born in the Rafiqpur village of Begumganj thana of Noakhali district.  His father was the late Karuna Kanta Nath and mother the late Shabitri Sundari Debi.

He passed his entrance from Chaumuhani Modonmohan High School in 1960.  He received his post-graduate degree in Commerce, Management  from Dhaka University in 1966. He started his professional career as a professor at Noakhali Government College.  He joined the East Pakistan Civil Service in 1969. He took part in the Bangladesh Liberation War in 1971.  After the independence of Bangladesh he worked as the Mohokuma Proshashak (Sub-Divisional Officer) in Gazipur in 1978.  He was the Additional Secretary of the Health and Family Welfare Ministry and Secretary of Rural Development, and Cooperative Division, from which he retired in 2003.

He was nominated as one of the advisers of the caretaker government along with nine other members.

Nath also wrote some books, of which the famous ones are Pother Dudharay and Shompritir Jonopoday.

References

1945 births
2018 deaths
Bangladeshi diplomats
Bangladeshi Hindus
University of Dhaka alumni
Advisors of Caretaker Government of Bangladesh
People from Begumganj Upazila